Gunpowder or "black powder" is a propellant used in early firearms.

Gunpowder may also refer to:

Arts and media
"Gunpowder" (song), by Wyclef Jean
 Gunpowder (TV series), a 2017 British historical drama television series

Places
 Gunpowder, Queensland, Australia
 Gunpowder River, Maryland, U.S.
 Gunpowder Town, an abandoned town, now Joppatowne, Maryland, U.S.

Other uses
 Gunpowder tea, a form of Chinese tea
 Smokeless powder, sometimes called gunpowder, a number of propellants used in firearms that produce negligible smoke
 A slang term for the South Asian spice mix idli podi or milagai podi.

See also
 Gunpowder empires
 Gunpowder Incident
 Gunpowder Plot